The 38th Golden Bell Awards (Mandarin:第38屆金鐘獎) was held on November 5, 2003 at the Sun Yat-sen Memorial Hall, Taipei, Taiwan. The ceremony was broadcast live by EBC.

Winners and nominees
Below is the list of winners and nominees for the main categories.

References

2003
2003 television awards
2003 in Taiwan